Hasteulia is a genus of moths belonging to the family Tortricidae.

Species
Hasteulia emmeles Razowski, 1999
Hasteulia romulca Razowski, 1999

See also
List of Tortricidae genera

References

 , 1999, Misc. Zool. 22: 88.
 , 2005, World Catalogue of Insects 5

External links
tortricidae.com

Euliini
Tortricidae genera